Dennis James Vaske (born October 11, 1967) is an American former professional ice hockey defenseman.

Vaske started his National Hockey League career with the New York Islanders in 1991. He also played for the Boston Bruins. He retired after the 1998–99 season. Internationally he played for the United States at the 1992 World Championships.

Career statistics

Regular season and playoffs

International

External links
 

1967 births
Living people
American men's ice hockey defensemen
Boston Bruins players
Capital District Islanders players
Ice hockey players from Illinois
Ice hockey players from Minnesota
Minnesota Duluth Bulldogs men's ice hockey players
New York Islanders draft picks
New York Islanders players
People from Plymouth, Minnesota
Sportspeople from Rockford, Illinois
Providence Bruins players